Golub is a surname. Notable people with the surname include:
 David Golub (1950–2000), an American pianist
 Gene H. Golub (1932–2007), mathematician and computer scientist
 Harvey Golub (1939–), former chief executive officer of American Express
 Jeff Golub (1955–2015), American jazz guitarist
 Leon Golub (1922–2004), an American artist
 Todd Golub, a Professor of Pediatrics at the Harvard Medical School
 Irina Golub (1980–), ballerina with the Mariinsky Ballet
 Ivan Golub (born January 10, 1989) a Ukrainian professional boxer

See also
 

Slavic-language surnames